Aanayum Ambaariyum is a 1978 Indian Malayalam film,  directed by Crossbelt Mani. The film stars Vincent, Kamalamma, Leela, Ravikumar, and Sudheer in the lead roles. The film has musical score by Shyam.

Cast
Kamalamma
Leela
Ravikumar
Sudheer
Vincent
Kavitha

Soundtrack
The music was composed by Shyam and the lyrics were written by Bharanikkavu Sivakumar and Kaniyapuram Ramachandran.

References

External links
 

1978 films
1970s Malayalam-language films
Films directed by Crossbelt Mani